Old Warden Tunnel is an abandoned railway tunnel near the village of Old Warden in Bedfordshire.

History
The tunnel was built as part of the Midland Railway connecting Bedford and Hitchin, and from there to London between 1853 and 1857. Contrary to popular belief the line lost its passenger services before the cuts of Dr. Beeching, they were withdrawn on 1 January 1962 along with goods services between Hitchin and Shefford. Goods services between Shefford and Bedford succumbed to the Beeching Axe on 28 December 1964. Built of blue engineering bricks, the tunnel is ovoid in shape and runs at a very slight gradient to allow drainage; however, it is perfectly straight. 

The tunnel has no blast relief ducts, due to its lack of curves and relatively short length, allowing good air passage. Regular niches were cut into the wall to allow maintenance on the permanent way during running hours.

This was also seen in the film Those Magnificent Men in Their Flying Machines The location where Sir Percy's aircraft lands on a train is the now closed line from Bedford to Hitchin. The tunnel into which they fly is the Old Warden Tunnel near the village of the same name in Bedfordshire; the tunnel had only recently been closed, and in the panning shot through the railway cutting, the cooling towers of the now-demolished Goldington power station can be seen.

The tunnel today
The tunnel has lain derelict for over 40 years, but is in fair condition, with the Hitchin end back-filled to within  of the tunnel roof and the Bedford end bricked up with gratings to allow access for bats. However, public access holes have been closed at both ends. Entrance to the tunnel is not recommended, due to bats and standing water accumulation. The Bedford Portal is still visible in its cutting, but the Hitchin Portal is entirely covered in undergrowth.

Nature reserve
The land above the tunnel is Old Warden Tunnel nature reserve, which is managed by the Wildlife Trust for Bedfordshire, Cambridgeshire and Northamptonshire.

See also 

 List of tunnels in the United Kingdom

References 

Railway tunnels in England
Rail transport in Bedfordshire
Nature reserves in Bedfordshire
Wildlife Trust for Bedfordshire, Cambridgeshire and Northamptonshire reserves
Tunnels in Bedfordshire

https://www.abandonedengland.com/oldwardentunnel